This is the list of broadcasters during the 2022–23 EFL Cup season.

Broadcasters

England and Ireland

Europe

Middle East

Africa

Asia

Americas

Oceania

References

EFL Cup
Football League Cup